Pen Talar is a drama series on S4C. The series tells the story of two families from west Wales over a period of half a century, starting in the 1950s and continuing until the present day. The main character, played by Richard Harrington, appears from the third episode onwards, as the previous episodes deal with the life of his character as a child. A substantial proportion of the film was filmed in Cil-y-Cwm, Carmarthenshire although filming also took place in Aberystwyth and Cardiff. The series was produced by Fiction Factory Films. The series was produced by Gethin Scourfield and directed by Gareth Bryn and Ed Thomas.

Cast
 Defi Lewis - Richard Harrington
 Douglas Green - Ryland Teifi
 Enid Lewis - Eiry Thomas
 John Lewis - Aneirin Hughes
 Siân Lewis - Mali Harries
 Albert Green - Dafydd Hywel

External links
 Official website
 PenTalarPedia - Unofficial wiki about the series

2000s British drama television series
2010s British drama television series
2010 British television series debuts
Serial drama television series
Television shows set in Wales
Television shows set in Cardiff
S4C original programming
2000s Welsh television series
2010s Welsh television series